Arthur Anthony Macdonell, FBA (11 May 1854 – 28 December 1930) was a noted Sanskrit scholar.

Biography
Macdonell was born at Muzaffarpur in the Tirhut region of the state of Bihar in British India, the son of Charles Alexander Macdonell, of the Indian Army. He was educated at Göttingen University, then matriculated in 1876 at Corpus Christi College, Oxford, gaining a classical exhibition and three scholarships (for German, Chinese, and the Boden Scholarship for Sanskrit). He graduated with classical honours in 1880 and was appointed Taylorian  Teacher of German (language) at Oxford. In 1883 he obtained his PhD from the University of Leipzig, and then became Deputy Professor of Sanskrit at Oxford in 1888, and Boden Professor of Sanskrit in 1899 (a post that carried with it a fellowship of Balliol College, Oxford).

Macdonell edited various Sanskrit texts, wrote a grammar, compiled a dictionary, and published a Vedic grammar, a Vedic Reader, and a work on Vedic mythology; he also wrote a history of Sanskrit.

Selected works

References

External links 

 
 
   Sanskrit Grammar, by Arthur Anthony Macdonell

1854 births
1930 deaths
British Indologists
Alumni of Corpus Christi College, Oxford
Fellows of Balliol College, Oxford
Boden Professors of Sanskrit
Chess historians
Sanskrit scholars from Uttar Pradesh
People from Muzaffarpur
Fellows of the British Academy